The surname Yale is derived from the Welsh word "iâl", which means fertile ground, which was the name of the estate Plas-yn-lal in Wales of the Lords of Yale.

Notable descendants with the surname include:
Thomas Yale (1525/6–1577), co-representative of the Royal House of Mathrafal, Diplomat, Ambassador to Queen Elizabeth Tudor, Chancellor to Archbishop Edmund Grindal, the head of the Church of England
Roger Lloyd Yale, his brother, Secretary to Cardinal Wolsey, the chief minister of King Henry VIII, grandson of the Baron of Gwyddelwern of the Royal House of Mathrafal
John Wynn Yale, his brother, father of David Yale, brother-in-law of Knight Simon Weston, ally of the Earls of Essex, and great-uncle of the 2nd Earl of Londonderry
David Yale (1540–1626), of Erddig Park, Chancellor of Chester, nephew of Chancellor Thomas Yale, married to Frances, daughter of Admiralty Judge John Lloyd, a cofounder of the 1st Protestant college at the University of Oxford
Thomas Yale Sr.(1580–1619), his son, father of Anne, Thomas, and David Yale, was a cousin of Francis Willughby and Duchess Cassandra Willoughby of Wollaton Hall, she was related to Jane Austen of Pride and Prejudice
Anne Yale Sr. (born 1595), daughter of Bishop George Lloyd, widow of Thomas Yale Sr., wife of Governor Theophilus Eaton, a cofounder of Massachusetts and Connecticut, family cofounded Harvard University
Anne Yale Jr., niece of Nathaniel Eaton, first head and builder of Harvard, married to Governor Edward Hopkins, 2nd governor of Connecticut and Lord Commissioner of the Admiralty for Oliver Cromwell
Thomas Yale Jr. (1616–1683), captain and merchant, Cofounder of New Haven Colony, fought in King Philip's War, was half-brother of Samuel Eaton, one of the seven founders of the Harvard Corporation
David Yale, wealthy Boston merchant, owner of a counting house, attorney to Robert Rich, 2nd Earl of Warwick, father of Governor Elihu Yale
Thomas Yale (1647–1736), captain, Justice of the Peace, early founder of Wallingford, descendants married into the Henry family, grandfather and uncles of Laura Spelman, wife of John D. Rockefeller
Thomas Yale (m. 1649), of Plas yn Yale, son of John Wynn Yale, captain in the service of King Charles I of England, married to Dorothy Hughes, of the native Royal House of Gwerclas
Dorothy Yale, his daughter, Lady of Cymer, wife of Hugh Hughes of Gwerclas, 14th Baron of Cymmer-yn-Edeirnion and Sheriff of Merionethshire, his grandfather fought at the Battle of Rowton Heath under King Charles I
Elihu Yale (1649–1721), president for the British East India Company, Governor and diamond trader, retired one of the richest men in Britain, Yale University named in his honor
Katherine Yale (1685–1715), daughter of Gov. Elihu Yale, wife of Dudley North of Glemham Hall, member of the House of North, family was the Earls of Guilford, and U.K. Prime Minister Lord Frederick North
Anne Yale (1687–1734), daughter of Gov. Elihu Yale, wife of Lord James Cavendish, son of the 1st Duke of Devonshire of Chatsworth House, member of the House of Cavendish
Ursula Yale (1689–1721), daughter of Gov. Elihu Yale, lived at Latimer House, in-laws were House of Herbert, House of Butler, House of Montagu, House of Cecil, of Hatfield House, Burghley House, etc
Stephen Yale (1732–1799), Revolutionary War captain, son of Elihu Yale (1703), Louisbourg Expedition soldier, grandson of Magistrate Theophilus Yale, great-grandson married to Chloe Whitney, of the Whitney family
Josiah Yale (1752–1822), Revolutionary war captain, great-grandfather of Jennie Gardner, wife of Attorney General James Lawrence, son of Senator and Congressman William Lawrence
Amasa Yale (1756), merchant, soldier in the Revolutionary War, in-laws were members of the Boston Tea Party, who threw 342 chests of tea into Boston Harbor, father was Nathaniel Yale (1720), Revolutionary War soldier
Phaley Yale (1762), sergeant, Dragoons regiment of the American Revolutionary War, served under Captain Samuel Blachley Webb and Colonel Elisha Sheldon, who served under Gen. Washington
Samuel Yale Sr. (1763–1810), entrepreneur in New York and Wallingford, pioneer in the manufacturing of Britannia ware, Yalesville named after his family manufacturing dynasty
Braddam Yale (1772), from N.Y., colonel during the War of 1812, son of Solomon Yale (1733), soldier in the French and Indian War under Col. Elihu Chauncey, family of Charles Chauncey, 2nd President of Harvard
David Yale (1775-1826), N.Y., grandfather of Judge Lawrence, the father of Robert A. Lawrence, State attorney, advisor to Gov. Mead, Director of Rutland National Bank, married granddaughter of Senator Hunton
Eunice Yale (1777–1857), daughter of Capt. Josiah Yale, grandmother of Mayor George W. Gardner, a descendant of Quincy and Adams family, of U.S. Presidents and Founding Father John Adams and John Quincy Adams
Levi Yale (1780–1844), businessman, joined the War of 1812, representative of the general assembly, candidate for Lieutenant Governor, postmaster under President Jackson and Van Buren
Eliza Yale (1783-1857), of Caldwell Manor, Quebec, grandmother of Laura A. Wood, wealthy Chicago philanthropist, President of Daughters of 1812, cofounder of Children's Hospital, family of Lt Gov. Catlin, Col. Wood, and Senator Depew, President for Cornelius Vanderbilt, founder of the Yale Club, member of Union League and Skulls and Bones 
Ira Yale (1783–1864), member of the Connecticut State House of Representatives from Wallingford, son of Capt. Elihu Yale (1747), American Revolutionary War bayonet manufacturer
Barnabas Yale (1784-1854), N.Y. Attorney, Justice of the Peace, Vice-President & cofounder of N.Y. Anti-Slavery Society, petitioned Congress (1838) to abolish slavery, with Senator Wright, married descendant of martyr Rogers
Cyrus Yale (1786-1854), N.Y., Minister, Reverend, peace reformer, N.Y. American Tract Society, urged U.S. to be 1st country to abstain from war, addressed the Hartford County Peace Society, fellow of Moses Brown
Joel Yale, great-grandson of Capt. Thomas Yale of New Haven Colony, was married to Lucy Rice, daughter of Mary Griswold, member of the Griswold family
Samuel Yale Jr. (1787–1864), entrepreneur, Britannia ware manufacturer in New York and Meriden, owner of the Meriden National Bank, with General Walter Booth, Secretary Silas Mix, Ashabel Griswold, etc
Charles Yale (1790), member of the Connecticut House of Representatives, father of Senator Charles Dwight Yale
Fanny Alsmena Yale (1790), New York, her daughter Clarissa Hills (1817) married to Alanson Hamilton Barnes, Associate Justice of the Supreme  Court of Dakota, appointed by Gen. Ulysses S. Grant
Levi Yale (1792–1872), merchant, joined the War of 1812, member of the Connecticut State House from Meriden, father of Levi B. Yale (1838), Prohibition candidate for Connecticut
Rosetta Yale (1795-1833), Yalesville, mother of Eli Ives, tin war manufacturer, grandmother of Harriet, wife of Judge Platt, appointed by Roosevelt, son of Senator and Congressman Platt, Big 4 with Senator Aldrich, in-law of Rockefeller Jr.
Linus Yale, Sr. (1797–1858), American inventor and Bank lock maker, 1st Mayor of Newport, New York, his patents signed by U.S. President Andrew Jackson
Allen Yale, brother of Linus Yale, Sr., co-owner of LG & Yale company, a weapon-making machine manufacturer, behind one million weapons built during the American Civil War for Abraham Lincoln
James Murray Yale (1798–1871), Montreal, chief trader for the Hudson's Bay Company in Canada, fur trader and competitor of John Jacob Astor, Yaletown named after him
Hannah Yale (1798–1871), grandmother of artist James Carroll Beckwith, member of the Art Students League of New York, worked for Teddy Roosevelt, General John Schofield, and Mark Twain
Andrew Yale (1800–1840), Montreal, brother of James Murray Yale, was a Manufacturer of ships and barges in Montreal, did business with Canadian Entrepreneur Luther H. Holton, a board member of McGill University
Moses Yale Beach (1800–1868), newspaper entrepreneur, banker, ambassador, owner of the New York Sun, most successful paper in America, personal spy of U.S. President James Polk for Mexican–American War, fortune 1/4 of Cornelius Vanderbilt
Leroy Milton Yale (1802–1849), son of Amerton Yale, a soldier in the Revolutionary War, graduated from Harvard in medicine, became a Doctor, and member of the Boston Society of Natural History
Edwin R. Yale (1804–1883), General, U.S. military commander, merchant, and entrepreneur, owner of Britannia ware factories in New York and Boston, partner of the Meriden Britannia Company
Elihu Yale (1807–1872), marble merchant, son of Ira Yale (1783), grandson of Capt. Elihu Yale, was judge of the Probate Court, chief of police, justice of the peace, and postmaster
Charles Dwight Yale (1810–1890), Senator, member of the Connecticut State Senate, shareholder of the Wilcox Silver Plate Co. and the Simpson, Hall, Miller & Co., founding member of the International Silver Company
Sharon Yale Beach (1809-1899), paper manufacturer, President of S. Y. Beach company, Justice of the Peace, his son George was a politician, Police Commissioner, Postmaster, member of Connecticut State House of Representatives, President of Manufacturer's National Bank and American Society of Railroad Superintendents
Elisha Yale (1810), N.Y., son of Nabby Griswold Tracy, member of the Griswold family, Nabby was the niece of Elizabeth Yale, daughter of Ruth Tracy and Capt. Josiah Yale, a commander in the Revolutionary War
Harriet Yale (1812-1872), Vermont, grandmother of Senator Edwin W. Lawrence, Freemason, trustee of Vermont University by Gov. Emerson, Special assistant to U.S. attorney general, Director of Banks and Central Public Corp. 
Ann Aurelia Yale (1815–1863), teacher, nursed Union Army wounded soldiers, married to James Adams, cabinet manufacturer, family of Gen. Charles Francis Adams, President of Lincoln's Union Pacific Railroad and member of the Adams family
Catherine Brooks Yale (1818–1900), wife of Linus Yale, relative of Gov. Bryant Butler Brooks and Bishop Phillips Brooks, her sister was president of the N.Y. Women's Suffrage Association, was taught by Ralph Waldo Emerson
George H. Yale (1820–1892), Montreal, nephew of James M. Yale, Justice of the Peace, major commander, mayor of Louiseville, leather manufacturer, owner of saw mills, tanneries & Yaletown village, Arthur Yale's uncle, cousin of Moses Y. Beach and Isabella, in-law of Gov. Simpson
Linus Yale, Jr. (1821–1868), inventor, entrepreneur, founded the Yale Lock Company, Premier manufacturer of locks in the U.S., partner of millionaire Henry R. Towne, a fellow of F.W. Taylor
Sarah S. Yale (1824-1900), Wallingford, Connecticut, married to Senator Edgar Atwater (1812), assistant State House Keeper, was of the family of Senator Charles Atwater
William Yale, member of the Connecticut State House of Representatives from Meriden, 1825
William Parry Yale (1825–1909), lieutenant colonel, High Sheriff of Denbighshire, inherited Plas yn Yale from his cousin Sarah Yale, and Madryn Castle from his relative Sir Thomas Love-Jones-Parry, son of Gen. Love Jones-Parry
Eliza Yale (1829–1865), James M. Yale's daughter, wife of Henry Newsham Peers, Chief trader for the HBC, Captain during the American Indian Wars for the 1st governor of Washington, Issac Stevens, cousin of George H. Yale
Henry Clay Yale (1829–1897), N. Y., married to a granddaughter of Revolutionary War Lt. White Jr., partner in Townsend & Yale, commission house, sole agent of Boston Manufacturing, first factories in America, Union League member
William H. Yale (1831–1917), Senator, 6th lieutenant governor of Minnesota under Governor Horace Austin, President of the Senate, member of the Minnesota State Senate
John Wesley Yale (1832–1900), colonel of the N.Y. Infantry, relative of Col. Means (War of 1812), chairman of the Democrats, friend of Gov. David B. Hill and Roswell P. Flower, trustee of N.Y. State Asylum by Teddy Roosevelt
William Yale Beach (1836-1910), N. Y. Freemason, son of Moses Yale Beach, was a banker and real estate developer, did business in the Masonic Temples of New York and Boston, brother of Moses Sperry Beach, newspaper owner during Lincoln's presidency
Andrew Yale Beach (1836-1921), Justice of the Peace, President of the family owned S. Y. Beach Paper Company, later sold to Pond’s Extract Company of New York, family were Freemasons of Connecticuts, and built the Masonic Hall in the company's Yale-Building in Seymour
Aurelia Yale (1839–1931), James M. Yale's daughter, wife of John D. Manson, son of Donald Manson, Chief factor for the HBC, and Félicité, daughter of fur trader Étienne Lucier, an early founder of Fort Astoria for John Jacob Astor
Isabella Yale (1840–1927), James M. Yale's daughter, wife of George Simpson, son of Sir George Simpson, Canadian Governor of the Hudson's Bay Company, Board director of the Bank of Montreal and the Bank of British North America
Leroy Milton Yale (1841–1906), doctor, surgeon, author, graduated from Columbia University, worked at hospital, prison, and lunatic asylum of Blackwell's Island, 1st President of the New York Etching Club, along with Charles A. Platt
Cyrus Yale Durand (1842–1887), father of Edward Dana Durand, Chief economist for the Department of Commerce under Secretary Herbert Hoover, teacher of finance and economics at Harvard and Stanford
Charles Benjamin Yale (1843), jewelry manufacturer in New York, President of the Dime Savings Bank, Chairman of the Board of School Visitors, shareholder of Simpson, Hall, Miller & Co. of New York
Marie Louise McCulloch Yale, wife of John Brooks Yale, her father was U.S. Treasury Secretary Hugh McCulloch, appointed by President Abraham Lincoln, central financier of the American Civil War
John Brooks Yale (1845–1904), son of Linus Yale, Union League, Treasurer of Yale Lock Co., N.Y. Representative of the Illinois Steel Company from the Empire Building, they acquired Carnegie Steel with J.P. Morgan
George Selden Yale (1846), jewelry manufacturer, real estate investor in Meriden, partner of the Simpson, Hall, Miller & Co. on Union Square, Manhattan, brother of Charles Benjamin Yale
Mary Victoria Yale (1847), Montreal, married to Major Commander Francois X. Lambert, one son became lieutenant and a daughter married to Mayor Louis A. Fortier, Justice of the Peace, Physician, Surgeon, from Mcgill University
Madeline Yale Wynne (1847–1918), daughter of Linus Yale, wife of Senator Henry Winn, son of Senator Reuben Winn, she was an American artist and philanthropist, her uncle was Congressman and Col. Halbert S. Greenleaf
Charles Gregory Yale (1847-1926), entrepreneur, grandfather of artist Yale Gracey, Secretary of San Francisco Yacht Club, 1st President of Pacific Inter-Club Yacht Association, father was wealthy mining claims lawyer for Senator Broderick
Julian L. Yale (1848–1909), son of Linus Yale, Union League, owner of Julian L. Yale & Co., a Railway supply business seated at the Railway Exchange Building and Rookery Building of Chicago, customers were Carnegie Steel, Illinois Steel, Lackawanna Steel
Caroline Ardelia Yale (1848–1933), an American educator and inventor, revolutionized the education of hearing-impaired people, collaborated with Alexander Graham Bell, Yale crater on Venus named in her honor
Frank Willey Yale (1854), husband of Fannie A. Bleecker, relative of Schuyler family, her grandfather Leonard was Major general under Gen. Montgomery and Lafayette, fought with Gen. Washington against Gen. Cornwallis
Helen Wakefield Yale (1854), wife of Supreme Court Judge John Hanson Kennard, descendant of Founding Father and Congressman John Hanson, 1st President of the Confederation Congress of the United States
John R. Yale (1855–1925), Freemason, entrepreneur, member of the New York State Assembly, Vice Chairman of the Panama–Pacific International Exposition, Chairman of the committee on Railroads
Helen Yale Smith (1855–1945), wife of William W. Ellsworth, grandson of Gov. and Congressman William Ellsworth, son of Senator and Founding Father Oliver Ellsworth, named by Washington, in-law of Noah Webster, funded by Hamilton
Charles Banks Yale (1856–1902), son of Senator and Lt. Gov. William H. Yale, General claim agent of the Great Northern Railway, owned by Canadians Lord Stephen and Lord Smith, and  American John Kennedy
Charles H. Yale (1856–1920), an American entrepreneur, theatre producer and performer in Boston, worked for the Boylston Museum
William H. Yale (1859–1926), owner of Townsend & Yale, one of oldest & largest commission house in the U.S., offices in N.Y., Boston, Chicago, Philadelphia, was a Yale graduate, member of the Yale Club, Sons of the Revolution, and Union League
Arthur Yale (1860-1917), Montreal, father of Claire Yale, gentleman, Magistrate of Côte-des-Neiges, landowner in Mount Royal, now Outremont, one of founding & largest shareholders of the Provincial Bank of Canada, cousin of Mary Victoria
May Yale Ogden (1865), wife of Peter C. Anderson, family of Founding Father and Congressman William Ellery, grandson of Peter Schemerhorn Chauncey (Mrs. Astor), and Knight Henry Anderson, in-law of Lorenzo Da Ponte, partner of Mozart
Rodney Horace Yale (1864-1937), Illinois, author of the Yale family genealogy book, was educated at Yale, Michigan, he was Secretary and board director of Dempsters in Nebraska, was later acquired by Warren Buffett of Berkshire Hathaway
Emmarette Yale (1864), wife of Frederick L. Huntington, manufacturer of printing presses, Freemason, Knights Templar, Connecticut politician, member of the Connecticut General Assembly, trustee of the YMCA, member of the Huntington family
Mary Yale Pitkin (1865), wife of architect Charles Eliot, son of Charles William Eliot, President of Harvard University, trustee of Andrew Carnegie and John D. Rockefeller,  member of the Eliot family, and cousin of poet T. S. Eliot
Eleanor Haggard Yale (1867-1953), wife of John Edward Yale, of Plas yn Yale, lawyer, Freemason, family of Sir H. Haggard, his novels were the basis for Indiana Jones and the League of Extraordinary Gentlemen, Sir V. Haggard, Royal Navy Admiral, Sir G. Haggard, British Consul General of N. Y., and H. Haggard, submarine Commander
Charles Yale Knight (1868–1940), entrepreneur and inventor of the sleeve valve technology, used for cars, tanks, airplanes, and by the Willys Company, main competitor of Henry Ford
Henry Yale Dolan (1869-1949), Philadelphia, millionaire bachelor, son of banker Thomas Dolan, President of United Gas, Union League founder, fortune at 11 million in 1914, partner of Thomas Edison, Warden, Elkins, and Widener, of Lynnewood Hall, Widener family
Sydney Yale Wynne (1870–1915), son of Senator Henry Winn, Doctor in West Point, New York, graduated from Harvard, was the grandfather of Lieutenant Colonel Theodore Fite, son of Col. John H. Fite
Mary V. Yale (1870–1916), wife of Eugene V. Bissell, related to CIA spymaster Richard Bissell, her brother-in-law was shipping magnate Edgar F. Luckenbach, niece was daughter of Charles Yost, United Nations Ambassador under Nixon
Jeannette Yale (1872), wife of artist George H. Hughes, studied at Académie Julian under Constant and Léon Bonnat, tutors of Braque and Lautrec, painted for Vice-President Levi Parsons Morton, who sold his business to J. P. Morgan
Elsie Duncan Yale (1873-1956), writer, wife of Dr. Arthur W. Yale Jr., owner of Union League's KLSD radio station, her father was Capt. Duncan, the Shipping Commissioner of the Port of New York, he organized America's first tourism cruise and travelled with Mark Twain for Innocents Abroad
Charles Yale Beach (1874–1917), real estate investor, son of N.Y. politician Moses S. Beach, was brother-in-law of military camouflage pioneer Abbott H. Thayer, his uncle Alfred joined the Union League and built N.Y.'s first subway system
William Hoyt Yale (1876–1948), son of Senator and Lt. Gov William H. Yale, was a member and stockholder of the American Philatelic Society, members included President Franklin D. Roosevelt and his Secretary Harold L. Ickes
Stanley Yale Beach (1877–1955), entrepreneur, aviation pioneer, Wright brothers competitor, owned Scientific American, financed Gustave Whitehead, built airplanes, airships, dealt with U.S Air Force founder Gen. Mitchell and Howard Hughes
Mortimer Yale Ferris (1881–1941), N.Y., Senator, civil engineer, member of the N.Y. State Senate, Chairman of the Lake Champlain Bridge Commission, M.I.T graduate, was a Freemason, father graduated from Harvard in medicine
Enid Yale (1884-1968), married to Wilbur T. Gracey, diplomat, Marshal, U.S. Consul-General at Nanking, China and Hong-Kong, Vice-Deputy Consul at Foochow, U.S. Consul at Seville, Spain and Progreso, Mexico, served Roosevelt
William Yale (1887–1975), spy, diplomat, in-law of Senator Hanna, Chairman of the Republicans, partner of J.P. Morgan & John D. Rockefeller, was Middle East special agent for Secretary Lansing, companion of Lawrence of Arabia, sent to Versailles 1919 by President Wilson
Mary Valentine Yale (1889–1948), married to Pelham St. George Bissell Jr., grandson of oil industrialist George Henry Bissell, railroad and bank owner, founder of the first oil companies in America, would be overtaken by John D. Rockefeller
Florence L. Yale (1890–1933), wife of Maj. Philip D. Hoyt, First Deputy Police Commissioner of N.Y., Mayor's Chairman, served Secretary Hoover, father-in-law was Chairman for the Democrats, launched President F.D.R. political career
Julia Meriam Yale (1892), daughter of Dr. Leroy M. Yale (1841), granddaughter of Caroline D. Eliot, the daughter of Senator and Congressman Thomas D. Eliot, and niece of William Greenleaf Eliot, members of the Eliot family
Frankie Yale (née Ioele) (1893–1928), American gangster, employer of Al Capone, fought for the control of the Brooklyn docks
John Corbert Yale (1898–1941), lieutenant colonel, son of Colonel James Corbet Yale, served in British India in the Hong Kong and Singapore Royal Artillery, lived at Plas yn Yale, the family estate in Wales
Claire Yale (1903-1997), Montreal, bourgeois, great-grandniece of James M. Yale, aunt of Dr. Jean-Francois Yale, founder of Historic Society of Saint-Eustache, family owned Yale Islands on Rivière des Mille Îles, half sold for 15 million
Olive Yale Anderson (1907–1987), daughter of May Yale Ogden, of the Ogden family, granddaughter of Major Elbert E. Anderson, attorney against Jay Gould and Boss Tweed, was N.Y. Transit Commissioner for President Cleveland
Thomas B. Yale (1917–1997), Washington, OSS spy, Director of Finance of the CIA, under CIA Director George H. W. Bush, backed Howard Hughes for Cold War Project, worked under JFK and Kissinger, probed Hunt for Coup on Castro
David C. Yale Simpson (1920–2001), Canadian entrepreneur, great-great-grandson of James M. Yale and Sir George Simpson, founder of Simpson Co., largest generator manufacturer in Canada, one of the top five in North America
Joseph Yale Resnick (1924-1969), N.Y., Congressman, entrepreneur, multimillionaire, was candidate for U.S. Senator, his aide became Advisor to Clinton, cofounded Channel Master Corporation, was radio officer during WWII
Brewster Yale Beach (1925–2008), reverend, psychotherapist, Yale graduate, founder of Carl Jung studies center in N.Y., his aunt was 1st woman chairman of Vassar College, wealthy, and daughter of one of 1st garment factory owner in N.Y.
David Yale (1928–2021), son of Colonel John Corbert Yale, was fellow at the University of Cambridge, President of the Selden Society, Honorary Queen's Counsel for England and Wales, granted by Queen Elizabeth II
Rolande Yale (1928), Montreal, wife of BP oil executive Yves Miron, member of the Mount Stephen Club, was secretary to Minister Claude Charron, Minister Marcel Leger, and Quebec Prime Minister Pierre-Marc Johnson
Stephen L. Yale (1935–2020), studied at Harvard, Dean of Students at Drexel University, HR Vice President at Comcast, Vice President of the College of Santa Fe, Board member of United Way
Donald Arthur Yale (1944), Chicago, President of Yale & Baker, President of Borsheims, their family owned Jewelry business, majority stake sold to Warren Buffett of Berkshire Hathaway in 1989, is featured in Buffett's letters to shareholders
Kim Yale (1953–1997), an American writer and editor for DC Comics, Marvel Comics, and Eclipse Comics, worked on Suicide Squad, Star Trek, and The Batman Chronicles
Stephen Yale-Loehr (born 1954), American attorney, author, Cornell graduate, law professor at Cornell, founding member of Business Immigration Lawyers, adviser concerning President Obama DAPA program
William Yale (1961), Washington, surface warfare officer, U.S. Navy, graduated from Johns Hopkins, Director of the Center for International Maritime Security, adjunct fellow of the American Security Project, work at the SAIS Institute
Brian Yale (born 1968), musician of Matchbox Twenty, nominated for Grammy awards, partner of artist Rob Thomas, a songwriter for Mick Jagger, Marc Anthony, etc
Ernest Yale, Montreal, Founder and President of Triotech, customers in 50 countries, investor and venture partner at Triptyq Capital, board member of Peerio technologies, member of Angel investor Quebec
Jean-Francois Yale, Montreal, doctor specialist, endocrinologist, chief physician at Royal Victoria Hospital, chairman of the Canadian Diabetes Association, professor at McGill University, board member of Diagnos
Pierre-Paul Yale, Montreal, brother of Jean-Francois Yale, doctor specialist, psychiatrist, chief physician at Haut-Richelieu Hospital, VP of Psychiatrists Association of Quebec, Expert committee member for Prime Minister Philippe Couillard
Janet Yale, Montreal, Canadian telecommunications lawyer and executive, CEO of Arthritis Society, CEO of Scouts Canada, executive vice president of Telus Communications, board member of CARE Canada

See also
Ial

Footnotes